Bernhardt Design (a division of the Bernhardt Furniture Company) is an American modern furniture company based in Lenoir, North Carolina. The company is known for working with a wide variety of international designers, and for their investment in programs supporting young designers and design students. The company sponsors an interdisciplinary course at the Art Center College of Design that allows students the opportunity for their designs to go into production. Bernhardt Design also sponsors ICFF Studio, a yearly scholarship program that gives young designers exposure at the International Contemporary Furniture Fair (ICFF) in New York City.

History
Bernhardt Furniture Company was founded in 1889 by John M. Bernhardt. Orphaned at 13, John Bernhardt left for Oregon to become a government surveyor but returned home three years later to pursue a career as a logger and timber cutter. After buying a sawmill, he saw an opportunity to use timber in the manufacture of sturdy oak bedroom furniture. The company he started quickly found a market in such urban centers as Chicago and New York City. As the business grew under the leadership of the Bernhardt family, new product categories, dining room and living room furniture were added and additional facilities were built or purchased from other furniture manufacturers.

Until the 1980s, the company was vertically integrated, having a veneer mill, lumber yard and numerous kilns as well as adhesives and particleboard plants. By 1981, Bernhardt began sourcing globally and now has offices in four Asian countries, staffed with 50 employees. The company still has a significant manufacturing operation in western North Carolina, with 12 facilities and 1500 employees.

In 1983, Bernhardt Furniture added a line of commercial furniture, Bernhardt Design which offers conservatively styled casegoods, conference and occasional tables, guest, lounge and wood guest chairs. Gradually, the product line expanded, adding more contemporary products and multi-purpose tables and seating and conference chairs. In order to encourage student designers to make their products suitable for mass markets, Bernhardt Design sponsors an interdisciplinary course with the world-renowned Art Center College of Design in Pasadena. Selected students in program have their products in the standard product line. Bernhardt Design also sponsors ICFF Studio, a scholarship program which gives deserving designers global exposure to manufacturers, retailers and the media.

Notable designers 
Bernhardt has worked with many notable artists and designers such as Chrissa Amuah, Ini Archibong, Fabien Baron, Anabela Chan, Terry Crews, Océane Delain, Joe Doucet, Noé Duchaufour-Lawrance, Monica Förster, Jaime Hayon, Patrick Jouin, Arik Levy, Ross Lovegrove, Tift Merritt, Ignacia Murtagh, Luca Nichetto, Charles Pollock, Kiki van Eijk, and Scott Wilson. The designer Jerry Helling is the company's creative director and president.

References

External links

 Bernhardt Furniture Company website

Furniture companies of the United States
Luxury brands
Modernism